Dewey Crossman Bailey (September 1, 1860 – December 17, 1937) was an American politician who served as the Republican mayor of Denver, Colorado from 1919 to 1923. Among the other events of his administration, in August 1920 Denver streetcar workers struck, causing a multi-day riot and requiring the insertion of federal troops.

Bailey was a United States Marshall for Colorado from 1897 to 1915. He died of heart disease in 1937.

References

External links

Mayors of Denver
Colorado Republicans
1860 births
1937 deaths